Imeľ (Hungarian pronunciation:) is a village and municipality in the Komárno District in the Nitra Region of southwest Slovakia.

History 
In historical records the village was first mentioned in 1404. It was sacked by Ottoman troops in 1561. It was also managed by Ottoman Empire during periods of 1566-1595, 1605-1606 and 1663-1685. It was recorded as "Imo" as part of Komaran nahiya in Estergon sanjak of Budin Eyalet in 1664 Ottoman record. It had 45 homes and 12470 akches of tax was collected.

After the Austro-Hungarian army disintegrated in November 1918, Czechoslovak troops occupied the area, later acknowledged internationally by the Treaty of Trianon. Between 1938 and 1945 Imeľ once more  became part of Miklós Horthy's Hungary through the First Vienna Award. From 1945 until the Velvet Divorce, it was part of Czechoslovakia. Since then it has been part of Slovakia.

Geography 
The village lies at an altitude of 111 metres and covers an area of 21.96 km².

Population
According to the 2011 census, the municipality had 2,054 inhabitants. 1,125 of inhabitants were Slovaks, 878 Hungarians and 51 others and unspecified.

Facilities 
The village has a public library, a gym and a  football pitch. It also has a cinema.

See also
 List of municipalities and towns in Slovakia

References

Genealogical resources

The records for genealogical research are available at the state archive "Statny Archiv in Nitra, Slovakia"

 Roman Catholic church records (births/marriages/deaths): 1705-1895 (parish A)
 Reformated church records (births/marriages/deaths): 1786-1936 (parish B)

External links 
 http://www.obecimel.sk
Surnames of living people in Imel

Villages and municipalities in the Komárno District
Hungarian communities in Slovakia